Konstantin Nikolayevich Batyushkov was a Russian poet, essayist and translator of the Romantic era.  He also served in the diplomatic corps, spending an extended period in 1818 and 1819 as a secretary to the Russian diplomatic mission at Naples.

Biography
The early years of Konstantin Batyushkov's life are difficult to reconstruct. He probably spent the first four years of his life in Vologda; the exact place he lived from 1792 to 1796 is unknown: possibly with his father, possibly with his grandfather, Lev Andreyevich Batyushkov, on their family estate, the village of Danilovskoe, Bezhetski district, Tver province. However, it was Konstantin's youth spent in St. Petersburg which played the most important part in his development as a poet.

Batyushkov's earliest extant letter from St. Petersburg is dated 6 July 1797. His first years there were spent in Pensionnats (private boarding schools). Contact with his relatives was restricted to correspondence and rare meetings. From 1797 to 1800 he studied at the Pensionnat directed by O.P. Jacquinot; it was a rather expensive school for children of good families. The curriculum included Russian, French, German, divinity, geography, history, statistics, arithmetic, chemistry, botany, calligraphy, drawing and dancing. In 1801 Batyushkov entered a Pensionnat run by an Italian, I.A. Tripoli; he graduated in 1802. It was here that Batyushkov began to study Italian. His first literary offering, however, was a translation into French of Metropolitan Platon's Address on the occasion of the coronation of Alexander I of Russia.

Early works

1802 is conventionally considered the beginning of Batyushkov's poetic career. He wrote in a letter to Nikolai Gnedich on 1 April 1810 that he had composed his first poem at the age of fifteen. Batyushkov quotes two lines; he felt that their main idea — dissatisfaction with reality and a longing for "distant lands", both geographic and spiritual — anticipated his mature work: "Муза моя, ещё девственница, угадала" (My Muse, while still a virgin, had divined it).

Batyushkov began to write poetry seriously in 1804 (at least, the dating of his first works from 1802—03 is not documented). Two poems are conventionally regarded as having been written before the first published one. The first of these, "Bog" (God), is a direct imitation of Gavrila Derzhavin's spiritual odes (Echoes of Derzhavin continued to appear in Batyushkov's mature work, but as only one element of his own, highly individual, style). The other poem is "Mechta" (the title, usually translated as "Dream", can also mean "Fantasy" or "Imagination"). Never satisfied with the realization of his idea, Batyushkov reworked "Mechta" for the rest of his literary life; thus it is possible to illustrate the evolution of Batiushkov's versification and verbal style using only examples from successive wordings of this piece. Including both original and translated fragments, this piece became a manifesto of Batiushkov's own aesthetics: "Mechtan'e est' dusha poetov i stikhov" (Dreaming is the soul of poets and of verse). This brings him close to Nikolay Karamzin and the Vasily Zhukovsky, but even in "Mechta", the literary pose of an escapist and hedonist is already evident. It was most likely the programmatic nature of this, on the whole rather weak, poem that continued to hold the interest of its otherwise self-critical author.

The journals, in which Batyushkov's first poems were published, are easy to link to his personal contacts. His first poetic offering was the satirical "Poslanie k stikham moim" (Epistle to My Verses); in January 1805 it appeared in "Novosti russkoi literatury", supplement to the periodical of Moscow University.

In the army

In the autumn of 1806 Napoleon occupied Berlin and most of Prussia, Russia's ally; Alexander I declared a mass levy. On 13 January 1807 Batyushkov, with the civil rank corresponding to the twelfth class, was attached to General Nikolai Nikolaevich Tatishchev's staff.  On 22 February he enlisted in the Petersburg battalion of the Militia as sotennyi (a junior officer), and immediately set out for the West. On 2 March he was in Narva, on the 19 March in Riga, from where he sent letters to Gnedich, containing an impromptu and another verse epistle. When taking part in the Prussian campaign, he met Ivan Aleksandrovich Petin, an officer, who was to become another close friend. Batyushkov fought at the battle of Gutstadt (22—27 May); on 29 May he was seriously wounded at the battle of Heilsberg. (A year later, on 20 May 1808, he was awarded the Order of St. Anne, 3rd class, for bravery.) After the battle he was transported to hospital and then to Riga where he was convalescing during June and July 1807.

In Riga, Batyushkov was living at the house of a merchant, Müguel, with whose daughter Emilie he fell in love. This episode formed the background for two poems: "Vyzdorovleniie" (Convalescence, 1815—16?), considered by Pushkin one of Batyushkov's best elegies, and "Vospominaniia 1807 goda" (Recollections of 1807), whose popularity is also testified to by Pushkin's note in his epistle "To Batyushkov" (1814). Both works strongly influenced the Russian elegy of the 1810s and 1820s.

The idea of presenting the main works of world literature in the Russian language and making them part of Russian belles lettres is characteristic of the early nineteenth century. Batyushkov might have come to similar ideas under the influence of Gnedich who was already working on his translation of the Iliad. First and foremost in importance to the literati were heroic epopees. This is why in Batyushkov's correspondence with Gnedich, "your poet" and "my poet" are Homer and Tasso, although Batyushkov considered only two extracts from his incomplete verse translation of Torquato Tasso's Gerusalemme liberata worth publishing. In his translation Batyushkov ignored the metric and stanzaic form of the Italian original, octave, and used the "classical" alexandrine.

In July 1809, he wrote his famous "Videnie na bregakh Lety" (A Vision on the Shores of the Lethe). "Videnie..." soon became widely known and brought the author a certain notoriety. In October 1809 it was sent to Gnedich who allowed to make a copy, which rapidly multiplied. Batyushkov wrote the poem following the French satirical tradition, but its material was wholly Russian: it describes a dream in which all contemporary Russian poets have unexpectedly died and turned up in Elysium; their works are immersed in the waters of the Lethe: those found wanting sink into oblivion. The Russian writers of the eighteenth century were not the main concern of the satire. In the poem, it is not only the notorious Ivan Barkov who escapes oblivion, but also Vasily Trediakovsky who was generally despised at that time. "Videnie" performs a balancing act between ridicule and obscenity, it is full of caustic allusions and offensively transformed or reinterpreted quotations. With "Videnie", Batyushkov's reputation was established; he began to regard himself as a mature and original poet, and started gathering material for a publication of his collected works.

Napoleon Invasion

On 22 April 1812 Batyushkov became an Assistant Keeper of Manuscripts at the Imperial Public Library. His colleagues included Gnedich, Krylov and Uvarov. In June he bought an apartment nearby. The quiet life ("thank God, I have wine, friends, tobacco...") was clouded only by ill-health ("I am so weak that shall not even outlive my verses").

But even now peace and calm denied Batyushkov: Napoleon invaded Russia on 12 June 1812. Batyushkov wrote to Pyotr Vyazemsky that had it not been for a fever, he would have immediately joined the army.

The scenes of destruction deeply affected him and determined his attitude to the war; he wrote to Gnedich of the French: "Barbarians! Vandals! And this nation of monsters even dares to speak of freedom, of philosophy, of philanthropy!". On 29 March Batyushkov entered military service, with the rank of junior captain.  It was the events of 1812 that dictated the mood of an epistle-elegy, "K Dashkovu" (To Dashkov), a turning-point in Batyushkov's poetics and weltanschauung. The poem echoes his personal letters and expresses his feelings on seeing Moscow in ruins.  The War becomes an incarnation of Evil: "Moi drug! ia videl more zla / I neba mstitel'nogo kary" (My friend! I saw a sea of evil / And wrath of the avenging heavens).

In January 1814 the Russians crossed the Rhine, entered France and moved in on the capital. The first month in Paris was an exciting time for Batyushkov. He even managed to attend a meeting of the Academy.  Batyushkov's impressions were negative and he wrote on 25 April 1814 that the age of glory for French literature had passed. This letter was also a literary work; an abridged version was published by the poet's friends in 1827. In May Batyushkov fell ill, grew depressed and decided to return home.  Batyushkov arrived in London in mid May and spent two weeks in England. On 25 May he was issued a passport to travel home via Sweden, and from 30 May to June was sailing from Harwich to Gothenburg. The crossing was described in a letter on 19 June 1814; Batyushkov later revised it as a traveller's sketch which was published in 1827.

1815-1817

In early January 1815 a crash of matrimonial hopes coupled with serious illness caused a nervous reaction.  In March Batyushkov set off in search of spiritual healing.  He spent the second week of Lent at a monastery in Tikhvin. It seems that Batyushkov experienced a religious conversion, evidence of which may be found in a poem of this year, "Nadezhda" (Hope). Apparently in the same year he composed a poem combining the motifs of love and fatal illness: "Posledniaia vesna" (The Last Spring), a free version of Charles-Hubert Millevoye's "La Chute des feuilles", one of the most popular elegies among Russian translators of the 1810s and 1820s. Another translation, "Mshchenie" (Vengeance) from Parny, was composed both as an addition to the earlier "Prividenie" (a "mirror image" of the same theme), and a possible sublimation of his disappointment in love, which was still eloquent in his poems.

In the first half of 1815 Batyushkov came to meet the young Aleksandr Pushkin at Tsarskoe Selo; in the eyes of later generations this meeting took on a historic or even symbolic meaning.

The verse volume of Opyty appeared in October 1817. It was divided into genre sections: "elegies" (opened by "Nadezhda" and concluded by a new version of "Mechta"); "epistles" (first, a "friendly" one, "Moi Penaty", and last, a "didactic" one to Murav'ev-Apostol); and "miscellanea" (a section with an undefined organizing principle, for some reason followed by three of Batiushkov's most recent works). Public recognition immediately followed. On 17 October 1817 Batyushkov became an honorary member of the "Military Society", on 18 November he was made an honorary librarian at the Public Library; and in April 1818 he became an honorary member of the "Free Society of the Lovers of Russian Letters".

Insanity and death

During 1820 Batyushkov's depression grew. In August he applied for leave to go to Germany, which was confirmed only in April 1821. From December 1820 to May 1821 he lived in Rome, then went to Teplitz for convalescence; in November he moved to Dresden. The first signs of approaching insanity were a series of quarrels on relatively insignificant grounds.  In 1820 an editor of "Syn otechestva" journal, Aleksandr Voeikov, permitted himself an unauthorized publication of an epitaph by Batyushkov. The author overreacted: Batyushkov, infuriated, sent Gnedich a letter intended for "Syn otechestva", claiming he had abandoned his writing forever. Pletnev, a genuine admirer of Batyushkov, attempted to palliate his "guilt" by publishing a panegyrical "inscription" to Batyushkov — who took it as yet another insult. Batyushkov's mind became clouded, and in a fit of depression he destroyed his latest manuscripts.

On 18 September and 12 December 1821 Batyushkov applied for retirement. Instead, the Emperor Alexander I granted him indefinite leave. He came to St. Petersburg on 14 April 1822 and travelled to the Caucasus from May to July; in August he arrived in Simferopol, where, over the following months, symptoms of persecution mania became obvious. He burnt his books and three times attempted suicide. On 4 April 1823 he was sent to St. Petersburg, supervised by a doctor. For a whole year his relatives and friends looked after him. In April 1824 he wrote a completely mad letter to the Emperor with a request to enter a monastery. After a word with Zhukovsky, Alexander I decided to send the unfortunate writer for treatment at state expense. From 1824 to 1828 Batyushkov was at the "Maison de santé" in Sonnenstein (Saxony), from 1828 to 1833 in Moscow; and from 1833 onward he lived in Vologda. On 9 December 1833 the incurable Batyushkov was at last released from service and granted a life pension.

When ill, he wrote only a few incoherent texts. His final poem was written in Vologda on 14 May 1853; it is a quatrain which concludes as follows: "Ia prosypaius', chtob zasnut', / I spliu, chtob vechno prosypat'sia" (I only wake to fall asleep / And sleep, to awake without end).

He died on 7 July 1855 from typhus and was buried in the Priluki Monastery near Vologda.

Notes and references

Further reading
 Konstantin Batyushkov, Writings from the Golden Age of Russian Poetry, Columbia University Press, 2017 (The Russian Library). Presented and translated by Peter France. )

External links
Poem "My Spirit" by Konstantin Batyushkov (English Translation)
Detailed biography in English

1787 births
1855 deaths
People from Vologda
19th-century poets from the Russian Empire
Russian male poets
Romantic poets
Writers of Gothic fiction
Deaths from typhus
18th-century people from the Russian Empire
19th-century writers from the Russian Empire
19th-century male writers from the Russian Empire